Quchan (also Romanized as Qūchān) is a village in Hureh Rural District, Saman County, Chaharmahal and Bakhtiari Province, Iran. In a 2006 census, its population was 653, in 178 families. The village is populated by Turkic people.

References 

Populated places in Saman County